Lake Senftenberg (formerly called Speicherbecken Niemtsch—Niemtsch reservoir) is an artificial lake in Landkreis Oberspreewald-Lausitz, Brandenburg, Germany. It is located in the Lusatian Lake District, a chain of artificial lakes. The lake is located on the border of Lower  and Upper Lusatia between the southern Brandenburg city of Senftenberg and its districts Niemtsch and Großkoschen. Lake Senftenberg is one of the largest artificial lakes in Germany with an area of 1300 hectares.

History 

The lake was created by the flooding of the former opencast  lignite mine of Niemtsch by the Black Elster from 15 November 1967 to November 1972.

 
Since the commissioning of the first beach section in 1973, the lake has enjoyed great popularity as a recreational area with holidaymakers, bathers, surfers and sailors. There are three official naturist beaches on the lake; on the north shore of the lake, at the campsite west of Großkoschen and at the "Südsee" between Peickwitz and Niemtsch.

After 1990, embankments were built on large sections, because the variable water level threatened to cause large parts of the lake edge to collapse.

From December 2010 to April 2013, a town harbour was built in Senftenberg. It was opened on 23 April 2013. It created a marina with over 100 boat moorings, an  floating pier and a harbour building. The construction costs amounted to €13 million.

Notes

References
   (Cottbuser Studien zur Geschichte von Technik, Arbeit und Umwelt, 19, historical planning perspective).
   (Festschrift for Prof. Dr. Dr. h.c. Bálint Balla on his 75th birthday)

External links
 
 Senftenberger See

Lake Senftenberg
Senftenberg
Senftenberg
Oberspreewald-Lausitz
Senftenberg
Nude beaches